Ross McConnell is an Irish Gaelic footballer who plays for the St Oliver Plunketts/Eoghan Ruadh club and for the senior Dublin county team. McConnell is 6'3" tall

Playing career

Inter-county
McConnell made his league debut for Dublin against Limerick on Saturday 10 February 2007, in Dublin's first league win of the season. Dublin won the game by a scoreline of 0-14 to 1-10. He made his championship debut for Dublin against Meath in the quarter final of the Leinster Senior Football Championship at Croke Park and played full back on the side which won the Leinster Senior football Championship on Sunday July 15. Ross was on Dublins winning team for the 2008 O'Byrne Cup winning team which defeated Longford in the final.

McConnell was sent off during the defeat to Cork in the 2010 All-Ireland semi-final.

Family life
McConnell's father played with Meath in the 1970s, while his grandfather Kevin senior was an All-Ireland medal winner with Meath in 1949 and 1954.

References

Year of birth missing (living people)
Living people
Dublin inter-county Gaelic footballers
St Oliver Plunketts/Eoghan Ruadh Gaelic footballers